The Dez River, the ancient Coprates (or Κοπράτας), is a tributary of the Karun River and is 400 km long. It is the site of the Dez Dam.

References 

Rivers of Khuzestan Province
Landforms of Khuzestan Province